The 1914 Connecticut gubernatorial election was held on November 3, 1914. Republican nominee Marcus H. Holcomb defeated Democratic nominee Lyman T. Tingier with 50.39% of the vote.

General election

Candidates
Major party candidates
Marcus H. Holcomb, Republican
Lyman T. Tingier, Democratic

Other candidates
W. Fisher, Progressive
Samuel E. Beardsley, Socialist
Duane N. Griffin, Prohibition
Charles B. Wells, Socialist Labor

Results

References

1914
Connecticut
Gubernatorial